United States gubernatorial elections were held on November 5, 1996, in 11 states and two territories. Going into the elections, seven of the seats were held by Democrats and four by Republicans. Democrats picked up the open seat in New Hampshire, and Republicans picked up the open seat in West Virginia, for no net change in the partisan balance of power. These elections coincided with the presidential election.

Election results

States

Territories

Closest races 
States where the margin of victory was under 5%:
 American Samoa, 2.0%
 Indiana, 4.7%

States where the margin of victory was under 10%:
 West Virginia, 5.8%
 Puerto Rico, 6.4%

See also
1996 United States elections
1996 United States presidential election
1996 United States Senate elections
1996 United States House of Representatives elections

Notes

References